Emile Claus (27 September 1849 – 14 June 1924) was a Belgian painter.

Life 

Emile Claus was born on 27 September 1849, in Sint-Eloois-Vijve, a village in West Flanders (Belgium), at the banks of the river Lys. Emile was the twelfth child in a family of thirteen. Father Alexander was a grocer-publican and for some time town councillor. Mother Celestine Verbauwhede came from a Brabant skipper’s family and had her hands full with her offspring.

As a child, Emile already loved drawing and on Sunday went three kilometres on foot to the Academy of Waregem (the neighbouring town) to learn how to draw. He graduated from the Academy with a gold medal. Although father Claus allowed him to take drawing classes, he did not fancy an artist's career for his son. Instead, he sent Emile as a baker’s apprentice to Lille (France). Emile learned French there but the job of a baker clearly did not appeal to him. He also worked for some time with the Belgian Railways and as a representative in the flax trade.

Studies

The urge to paint did not let go of Emile and he wrote a letter for help to the famous composer and musician Peter Benoit, who lived in nearby Harelbeke and was an occasional visitor of the family. Only with some effort, Peter Benoit managed to convince father Claus to allow his son to train at the Antwerp Academy of Fine Arts. Claus did have to pay for his studies himself though. After graduating, he stayed to live in Antwerp.

In 1883 Claus moved to cottage Zonneschijn ('Sunshine') in Astene, near Deinze (East Flanders, Belgium), where he stayed until his death. From his living room, he enjoyed a beautiful view across the river Lys. The space and light of the country house clearly inspired him.

Artistically, Claus soon prospered. As a celebrity, he became a friend of the family with amongst others the French sculptor Auguste Rodin and the naturalist Émile Zola, and with the Belgian novelists and poets Cyriel Buysse, Emile Verhaeren, Pol de Mont and Maurice Maeterlinck. He travelled around the world to attend exhibitions of his work.

An important person in the life of Emile Claus was the painter Jenny Montigny. She followed master classes at his workshop in Astene and for years travelled back and forth between Ghent and Astene. Although Claus was 26 years older than she was, they began a relationship that would last until Claus' death. Another of his private students was the Belgian artist Anna De Weert. She, and her husband , spent summers with him in the 1890s.

The First World War interrupted Claus' international success. He fled to London where he found a house and workshop at the banks of the river Thames. He returned in 1918.

Career 

From 1869 to 1874, Claus trained at the Antwerp Academy of Fine Arts with, amongst others, the landscape painter Jacob Jacobs. During his training, Claus attracted the attention of and found favour with the local upper middle class.

In 1882 Claus had completed Cock Fight in Flanders, The realistic painting portrays the dignitaries of Waregem, collected around a small arena with two fighting roosters.

One of the dignitaries was the Waregem notary Eduard Dufaux. At the notary's home, Emile got to know Eduard’s niece Charlotte Dufaux. They got married in 1886.

Artistically and financially, Claus soon prospered. The Antwerp Museum of Fine Arts purchased one of his works, and The Picknick (1887), his well-known painting showing a farmer’s family watching the Sunday outing of the urban bourgeoisie on the opposite bank of a small river (the Lys), was bought by the Belgian Royal Family.

Under the influence of Claude Monet, he developed a style that has been characterized as luminism. In 1904, he started the artist group Vie et Lumière ('Life and Light').

In 1918, at his return from London after World War I and with the dawn of expressionism, Claus found his fame diminished. In 1921, he was given a last survey exhibition in Brussels, where especially his London works (about the city and the river Thames) made a positive impression on the public.

Art 

During his years in Antwerp, Claus mainly painted portraits and realistic, anecdotal genre pieces.

Stimulated by his friend, the author Camille Lemonnier, and influenced by the French impressionists, like Claude Monet whose works he got to know during his trips to Paris in the 1890s, Claus gradually shifted from naturalistic realism to a very personal style of impressionism called 'luminism', because of the luminous palette he used.

His paintings The Beet Harvest (1890) and The Ice Birds (1891) represent important turning points in this evolution.

The Beet Harvest shows farmers harvesting sugar beets, hacking them out of the frozen field. The painting is gigantic in size and hangs at the Museum of Deinze and de Leiestreek in Deinze, Belgium. Claus never sold it and after his death, his widow donated it to the city of Deinze on the condition they built a museum to exhibit it. The painting can now indeed be found at the Museum van Deinze en de Leiestreek (museum of Deinze and the Lys area') in Deinze (Belgium).

The Ice Birds (1891) shows an icy landscape with playing children. The painting was inspired by the novella of the same title by the Waregem novelist Léonce Ducatillon. The naturalistic story is set at the Keukelmeersen ('keukel meadows'), a swampy area with dips, drains, ditches and trenches near the centre of Waregem.

Every winter, it got flooded and changed into a wide icy plain. At the end of the story, one of the poor hungry boys falls through the ice while trying to pull out a frozen fish, and drowns. The painting is now part of the permanent collection of the Museum of Fine Arts in Ghent (Belgium).

Claus is considered to be the pioneer of Belgian luminism. In 1904, he founded the society Vie et Lumière ('life and light') and became known as the 'sun painter' and the 'painter of the Lys'. A magnificent example is his painting Cows crossing the Lys (1899), which shows a group of motley cows being herded across a small river, with sunlights reflecting off the moving water. The painting hangs in the Royal Museum of Fine Arts in Brussels (Belgium).

During the First World War, while in exile in London, he painted a series of views on the river Thames, known as "reflections on the Thames", in the style of Monet. They are his most traditional impressionist works.
On 14 June 1924, Claus died in Astene. His last words were: "Bloemen, bloemen, bloemen …” ('Flowers, flowers, flowers'). The day before his death, he had painted a pastel of a bouquet of flowers, sent to him by Queen Elisabeth of Belgium. Claus is buried in his own garden in Astene and a street is named after him in Brussels.

Honours 
 1919 : Commander of the Order of Leopold.
 1911: Member of the Royal Academy of Science, Letters and Fine Arts of Belgium.

Works
Other well-known works by Emile Claus include:

In 2007, the paintings The Beet Harvest and The Ice Birds have been included in the cultural heritage list of the Flemish community.

Museums and public collections 

Claus' paintings can be seen in the following museums, collections, and cities:

 The Groeningemuseum, Bruges, Belgium
 The Royal Museums of Fine Arts of Belgium, Brussels, Belgium
 The Museum van Deinze en de Leiestreek, Deinze, Belgium
 The Camille Lemonnier Museum, Elsene, Belgium
 The Museum of Fine Arts, Ghent, Belgium
 The  (MAMAC), Belgium
 The , Mons, Belgium
 The Mu.ZEE, Ostend, Belgium
 The Museum of Fine Arts, Tournai, Belgium
 The Kunstmuseum Den Haag, The Hague, The Netherlands
 The Musée de la Chartreuse, Douai, France
 The Palace of Fine Arts, Lille, France
 The Musée d'Orsay, Paris, France
 The Museum of Western and Eastern Art, Odessa, Ukraine
 The Fine Arts Museums, San Francisco, US
 Collection of the Province of East Flanders, Belgium
 Belfius Art Collection, Brussels, Belgium
 Adelaide, Australia
 Barcelona, Spain
 Bayonne, France
 Berlin, Germany
 Florence, Italy
 Göteborg, Sweden
 Osaka, Japan
 Reims, France
 Rome, Italy
 São Paulo, Brazil
 Venice, Italy
 Verviers, Belgium
 Warsaw, Poland

References 

 "The Work of Emile Claus" by Gabriel Mourey, in The Studio, issue 77, August 1899, p. 143-157.
 C. Lemonnier, Emile Claus, Brussels, 1908.
 A. Santon, Emile Claus, Un prince du luminisme ('A Prince of Luminism'), Brussels, 1946.
 F. Maret, Emile Claus, Antwerp, 1949.
 Emile Claus, exhibition catalogue, Ghent, Museum of Fine Arts, 1974.
 P. & V. Berko, "Dictionary of Belgian painters born between 1750 & 1875", Knokke 1981, p. 98-101.
 Lexicon van Westvlaamse beeldende kunstenaars ('Lexicon of West Flemish Visual Artists'), 3, Kortrijk, 1994.
 Le dictionnaire des peintres belges du XIVe siècle à nos jours ('Dictionary of Belgian Painters from the 14th Century to Present Day'), Brussels, 1994.
 J. De Smet, Emile Claus, exhibition catalogue, Ostend, P.M.M.K. ('Provincial Museum of Modern Art'), 1997.
 M. Tahon-Vanroose, De Vrienden van Scribe. De Europese smaak van een Gents mecenas ('The Friends of Scribe. The European Taste of a Ghent Maecenas'), exhibition catalogue, Ghent-Antwerp, 1998.
 Allgemeines Künstlerlexikon ('General Art Lexicon'), 19, Munich-Leipzig, 1998.
 J. De Smet, Sint-Martens-Latem en de Kunst aan de Leie (St Martin's Latem and the Art at the River Leie'), Tielt, 2000.
 J. De Smet, 'Emile Claus', in: Nationaal Biografisch Woordenboek ('National Biographical Dictionary'), p. 16, Brussels, 2002.

External links
 

1849 births
1924 deaths
19th-century Belgian painters
19th-century Belgian male artists
20th-century Belgian painters
People from Waregem
Royal Academy of Fine Arts (Antwerp) alumni
Members of the Royal Academy of Belgium
20th-century Belgian male artists